The National Party South Africa (NP) is a registered South African political party, who competed for the Western Cape province in the 2009 provincial election and municipal council seats in the 2011 local government elections.

History
On 5 August 2008 a new party using the National Party name was formed and registered with the Independent Electoral Commission. The initial leadership was held by David Sasman, Juan-Duval Uys, Abdullah Omar, (all previously with the controversial National People's Party [NPP]) and a fourth person, not immediately named, who later turned out to be Achmat Williams. Williams, a former New National Party (NNP) politician, was a member of the Independent Democrats before co-founding the new party. Other than some low-level former members, the new party had no formal connection with the now defunct NNP. The relaunched National Party of 2008 promotes a non-racial democratic South Africa based on federal principles and the legacy of FW De Klerk.

A press release issued by Jean-Duval Uys on the party's website, dated 22 January 2009, deals with a Cape High Court challenge against Uys by Williams and Omar on behalf of themselves and Sasman for leadership of the party ahead of the 2009 General Election. Before the court case was finalised, Uys announced that he had joined the Congress of the People. Williams is now listed as the national leader on the party's website.

Policies
The National Party campaign is based on the following policies:
 improving the standard of education, and providing it for free 
 providing better and free quality health care
 increase of state pensions 
 free feeding schemes as schools
 abolition of same-sex marriage
 reinstatement of capital punishment for convicted murderers and rapists
 reintroduction of religious instruction and corporal punishment in schools

Current participation
Although the party was on the ballot for the Western Cape Provincial Parliament in the 2009 poll, they only attracted 3 378 votes and failed to secure a seat. They nominated several candidates registered for the 2011 local government elections, one of whom, Bonita Elvira Hufkie, was listed on her ward ballot for both the National Party and the Pan Africanist Congress. The NP failed to win any wards, but obtained one council seat through the proportional representation vote, which will be filled by Achmat Williams, who topped the party's PR candidate list.

Parliament

Provincial elections

See also

National Party (South Africa)
New National Party (South Africa)

References

External links
National Party

2008 establishments in South Africa
Afrikaner nationalism
Afrikaner organizations
Boer nationalism
Conservative parties in South Africa
Federalist parties
National conservative parties
Political parties established in 2008
Political parties in South Africa
Protestant political parties